Riel is a provincial electoral division or riding in the Canadian province of Manitoba. It was created by redistribution in 1968, and has formally existed since the provincial election of 1969. The riding is located in the south-central region of Winnipeg, Manitoba's capital and largest city, and is named after Louis Riel, the leader of the 1870 Red River Rebellion.

Riel is bordered to the south by Seine River, to the east and north by St. Vital, and to the west by of Fort Garry and Fort Richmond, across the Red River of the North.

The riding's population in 1996 was 20,228. The riding's character is mostly middle- and upper middle-class. In 1999, the average family income was $63,126, and the unemployment rate was 5.50%. Nine percent of the riding's residents are francophone.

The service industry accounts for 15% of Riel's economy, followed by health and social services at 12.5%.

Riel has more often been represented by candidates of the Progressive Conservative Party than the New Democratic Party (NDP).The current MLA is Progressive Conservative Rochelle Squires. The previous MLA was Christine Melnick of the NDP, who won with 53% of votes cast in 2003 and 60% in the 2007 Manitoba election.

List of provincial representatives

Electoral results

 
|Progressive Conservative
|Shirley Render 
| style="text-align:right;" |3,119
| style="text-align:right;" |37.83
| style="text-align:right;" |-6.20
| style="text-align:right;" |$20,036.18

Previous boundaries

References

Manitoba provincial electoral districts
Politics of Winnipeg
1969 establishments in Manitoba
Louis Riel